Șerban Pavlu (born 29 June 1975) is a Romanian actor. He has appeared in more than thirty films since 1995. He is well known for the successful TV series Umbre broadcast on HBO, his role in the soap opera "Fetele Marinarului" and in the television  format "În puii mei", which aired on Antena1.

In 2008 the actor was chosen by DreamWorks Animation to provide the Romanian voice of Po in the animated movie Kung Fu Panda.

Selected filmography

References

External links 

1975 births
Living people
Romanian male film actors